John H. Harbourne (September 9, 1840 - November 29, 1928) was an English born American soldier who fought in the American Civil War. Harbourne received his country's highest award for bravery during combat, the Medal of Honor. Harbourne's medal was won for his actions during the Second Battle of Petersburg on June 17, 1864. He was honored with the award on February 24, 1897.

Harbourne was born in England, and immigrated with his family to the US in 1850. He joined the Army from Readville, Massachusetts in May 1864, and was discharged due to disability only four months later. He was later buried in Fernwood, Pennsylvania.

Medal of Honor citation

See also

List of American Civil War Medal of Honor recipients: G–L
Second Battle of Petersburg
Overland Campaign
29th Massachusetts Infantry

Notes

References

External links
John H Harbourne, Find a Grave

1840 births
1928 deaths
American Civil War recipients of the Medal of Honor
English emigrants to the United States
English-born Medal of Honor recipients
People of Massachusetts in the American Civil War
Union Army soldiers
United States Army Medal of Honor recipients